The Château de Fromental is an historic château in Fromental, Haute-Vienne, France. It was built in the 17th century. It has been listed as an official historical monument since June 8, 1925.

References

Châteaux in Haute-Vienne
Monuments historiques of Nouvelle-Aquitaine
Houses completed in the 17th century